WZVN may refer to:

 WZVN-TV, a television station (channel 28, virtual 26) licensed to Naples, Florida, United States
 WZVN (FM), a radio station (107.1 FM) licensed to Lowell, Indiana, United States